William Fred Mayfair (born August 6, 1966) is an American professional golfer who plays on the PGA Tour.

Early years and amateur career
Mayfair was born in Phoenix, Arizona. Before his fifteenth birthday, he won numerous junior golf tournaments. In 1981, he was on the cover of Boys' Life magazine as "golf's junior hotshot".  He attended Arizona State University and was a member of the golf team. He  won the 1986 U.S. Amateur Public Links and the 1987 U.S. Amateur, defeating University of Tennessee graduate Eric Rebmann 4&3. He won the 1987 Haskins Award for the nation's top collegiate golfer.

Professional career
Mayfair turned professional in 1988 and has won five events on the PGA Tour, including the 1995 Tour Championship. He has featured in the top 50 of the Official World Golf Rankings, going as high as 26th in 1996. He holds the distinction of being the only player to ever beat Tiger Woods in a playoff on the PGA Tour (1998 Nissan Open).

Mayfair was the medalist at the 2010 PGA Tour's Qualifying School. He finished 142nd on the Tour money list that year, which granted him conditional status for 2011. He finished the 2011 season 109th on the money list and retained his tour card for 2012. In 2013 and 2014 Mayfair split his playing time between the PGA Tour and the Web.com Tour, playing mostly on the Web.com Tour in 2014. During his PGA Tour career, Mayfair made 761 starts and earned over $20.3 million. In 2016, he joined PGA Tour Champions.

Personal life
Mayfair lives in Scottsdale, Arizona where he plays out of Estrella Mountain Ranch Golf Club. On July 31, 2006, he was diagnosed with testicular cancer. He had surgery on August 3 of that year and it has been reported that the cancer was contained. In April 2021 he announced that he had been diagnosed as having autism spectrum disorder (ASD) in November 2019.

Amateur wins
this list may be incomplete
1986 U.S. Amateur Public Links
1987 Pacific Coast Amateur, U.S. Amateur
1988 Pacific Coast Amateur

Professional wins (5)

PGA Tour wins (5)

PGA Tour playoff record (2–5)

Results in major championships

LA = Low Amateur
CUT = missed the half-way cut
"T" = tied

Summary

Most consecutive cuts made – 4 (three times)
Longest streak of top-10s – 1 (six times)

Results in The Players Championship

CUT = missed the halfway cut
"T" indicates a tie for a place

Results in World Golf Championships

1Cancelled due to 9/11

QF, R16, R32, R64 = Round in which player lost in match play
"T" = Tied
NT = No tournament
Note that the HSBC Champions did not become a WGC event until 2009.

U.S. national team appearances
Amateur
Walker Cup: 1987 (winners)

Professional
Four Tours World Championship: 1991

See also
1988 PGA Tour Qualifying School graduates
2010 PGA Tour Qualifying School graduates

References

External links

American male golfers
Arizona State Sun Devils men's golfers
PGA Tour golfers
Golfers from Scottsdale, Arizona
Golfers from Phoenix, Arizona
Sportspeople with autism
1966 births
Living people